The 1960 Pacific Tigers football team represented the College of the Pacific during the 1960 NCAA University Division football season.

Pacific competed as an independent in 1960. They played home games in Pacific Memorial Stadium in Stockton, California. In their eighth season under head coach Jack Myers, the Tigers finished with their first losing record since 1954, a record of four wins and six losses (4–6). For the season they were outscored by their opponents 140–278.

Schedule

Team players in the NFL
The following College of the Pacific players were selected in the 1961 NFL Draft.

Notes

References

External links
Game program: Pacific at Washington State – October 22, 1960

Pacific
Pacific Tigers football seasons
Pacific Tigers football